M-105 was the designation of a former state trunkline highway in the Thumb region of the US state of Michigan. It served as a connecting route between M-53 in Popple and M-83 (now M-142) near Elkton. The designation was in use in the 1920s and 1930s, and it has not been reused since.

Route description
M-105 began at an intersection with M-53 (Van Dyke Road) in the small community of Popple, just before M-53 curves east towards Bad Axe. The highway followed what is currently known as Kilmanagh Road westward for about a mile along the Colfax–Sheridan township line. At the intersection with Grassmere Road, M-105 turned northward along the Colfax–Oliver township line. Running through what is today farm country and rural areas, the highway crossed the Pinnebog River north of an intersection with Glassburner Road. M-105 terminated at an intersection with M-83 (Pigeon Road), about  miles east of Elkton.

History
The Huron County Commission asked the department to reconsider its decision in October 1928.
and construction of the highway started that July. The July 25, 1929, edition of the state's highway map showed M-105 running due north on a gravel road from M-53 at Popple, but by January 1, 1930, the alignment was shifted on maps to run west of Popple before turning northward to M-83 along different gravel roads.

Additional gravel was purchased for the highway in 1936, and the highway formed part of a detour in 1937 for a paving project on M-53. In 1936, the state's traffic surveys showed between 138 and 231 vehicles a day using the highway on average.

The designation was decommissioned in July 1939 when the roadway was transferred back to local control. As of 2022, the designation is not in use.

After the designation was removed, the Community Club of Huron County sent a resolution to State Highway Commissioner Murray D. Van Wagoner requesting that the state create a replacement state highway connecting M-53 and M-83 along a different roadway parallel to the former M-105.

Major intersections

See also

References

External links

M-105 at Michigan Highways

105
Transportation in Huron County, Michigan